John Wylie Grant (1891 – after 1915) was an English professional footballer who played as a centre forward throughout Europe in the early part of the twentieth century.

Career
Born in London, Grant played in Ireland for Cliftonville, in Sweden, in England for Southport Central and Woolwich Arsenal, and in Italy for Genoa. At Arsenal, Grant scored 3 goals in 4 games in the Football League.

References

1891 births
Year of death missing
Footballers from Greater London
English footballers
Association football forwards
Cliftonville F.C. players
Southport F.C. players
Arsenal F.C. players
Genoa C.F.C. players
English Football League players